John Arthur Spenkelink (March 29, 1949 – May 25, 1979) was an American convicted murderer. He was executed in 1979, the first convicted criminal to be executed in Florida after capital punishment was reinstated in 1976, and the second (after Gary Gilmore) in the United States.

Crime
Spenkelink escaped from a California prison in 1972, where he was serving a five-years-to-life sentence for armed robbery of a fast-food restaurant, five gas stations and two people.  On February 4, 1973, the 24-year-old Spenkelink picked up hitchhiker Joseph J. Szymankiewicz and checked into a hotel in Tallahassee, Florida. The two had been on an apparent robbery spree. The two got into a heated argument, Spenkelink left the hotel room and upon his return shot Szymankiewicz in the back and beat him with a hatchet.

Less than a week later, Spenkelink was arrested on suspicion of armed robbery in Buena Park, California and the murder weapon was found in an apartment of one of Spenkelink's associates.

Spenkelink claimed he had acted in self-defense—that Szymankiewicz had stolen his money, forced him to play Russian roulette, and sexually assaulted him.

After he was charged, Spenkelink turned down a plea bargain to second-degree murder that would have resulted in a life sentence. In 1973 he was convicted of first-degree murder and sentenced to death. Frank Brumm was also tried as a co-defendant for the murder but was acquitted. After Brumm's acquittal he said Spenkelink had offered him $1,000 to “get rid of” a friend, and that he and Spenkelink both shot Syzmankiewicz and beat him with the hatchet. After Szymankiewicz was dead, Brumm said he and Spenkelink finished a bottle of gin over the body.

Death Penalty

In a 1972 court case, the U.S. Supreme Court struck down death penalty schemes in all states, ruling that it had been applied unfairly. Florida and other states rushed to rewrite less-arbitrary laws.

Spenkelink appealed his sentence, but in 1977, Governor Reubin Askew of Florida signed Spenkelink's first death warrant. In 1979 Askew's successor, Governor Bob Graham, signed a second death warrant. Spenkelink continued to appeal, earning stays from both the U.S Court of Appeals and the U.S. Supreme Court, but both stays were overturned, meaning that Spenkelink would be the first man put to death involuntarily (Gilmore had insisted he wanted to die) since executions were resumed in the U.S. in 1976.

Spenkelink's case became a national cause célèbre, encompassing both the broader debate over the morality of the death penalty and the narrower question of whether capital punishment fit Spenkelink's crime.  His cause was taken up by former Florida Governor LeRoy Collins, actor Alan Alda, and singer Joan Baez, among many others.  Also at issue was whether capital punishment discriminated against the poor and underprivileged—Spenkelink often signed his prison correspondence with the epigram, "capital punishment means those without capital get the punishment."

The execution was finally carried out on May 25, 1979, in "Old Sparky", the Florida State Prison electric chair.  That morning, Doug Tracht, a popular Jacksonville disc jockey, aired a recording of sizzling bacon on his radio program and dedicated it to Spenkelink.

Aftermath

Abuse allegations
Shortly after Spenkelink's execution and burial at Rose Hills Memorial Park, another Florida death row inmate alleged that prison officials had manhandled and assaulted Spenkelink during preparation for his execution. Several decisions lent credence to these allegations: corrections officials had obscured the death chamber's viewing window while Spenkelink was strapped to the electric chair, citing anonymity concerns; the county did not perform an autopsy on Spenkelink (in violation of state law) because the county coroner considered it a redundant and prohibitively expensive policy; and the prison superintendent had limited visits from family and clergy on Spenkelink's execution day, citing fear of a suicide attempt.

Governor Graham commissioned an investigation, which in September 1979 concluded that Spenkelink had been "taunted" and had loud exchanges with prison guards and staff immediately before his execution, but had not been physically abused. Florida corrections officials responded by allowing witnesses to see the complete execution process going forward. Florida's counties now perform autopsies on all executed inmates.

Murder allegations

In spite of the state's investigation, a rumor began that Spenkelink had been murdered prior to his being brought into the death chamber. The rumor reached Spenkelink's mother Lois, who, after encouragement from a spiritual advisor, paid to have her son's body exhumed for a post-mortem examination. On March 6, 1981, Los Angeles County Coroner Thomas Noguchi announced his finding that the cause of Spenkelink's death was indeed electrocution.

See also 
 Capital punishment in Florida
 Capital punishment in the United States
 List of people executed in Florida

References

General references
 Execution List - Florida Department of Corrections
 John Arthur Spenkelink - Clark County (IN) Prosecutor

External links 
 Long article on Spenkelink - TIME Magazine [as of 2015, behind paywall]
 Article on Spenkelink and others - St. Petersburg Times
 

1949 births
1979 deaths
People executed for murder
20th-century executions by Florida
People executed by Florida by electric chair
People convicted of murder by Florida
American people convicted of murder
People from Le Mars, Iowa
20th-century executions of American people
Executed people from Iowa
Burials at Rose Hills Memorial Park